Luigi Burlando (23 January 1899 – 12 December 1967) was an Italian football midfielder and manager. He also played water polo.

Club career
Originally from Genoa, he played all of his career in his hometown, starting off with Doria, before spending a decade with Genoa.

International career
At international level, Burlando most notably represented Italy at the 1920 and the 1924 Summer Olympics. He made 19 appearances for Italy in total between 1920 and 1925, scoring once. He also competed in the men's water polo tournament at the 1920 Summer Olympics.

Honours
Genoa
Italian Football Championship: 1922–23, 1923–24

References

1899 births
1967 deaths
Italian footballers
Italy international footballers
Association football midfielders
Serie A players
Olympic footballers of Italy
Footballers at the 1920 Summer Olympics
Footballers at the 1924 Summer Olympics
Italian male water polo players
Olympic water polo players of Italy
Water polo players at the 1920 Summer Olympics
Genoa C.F.C. players